Marc's Stores is a discount drugstore-and-grocery chain, with stores in northern and central Ohio. It is owned by Clevelander Marc Glassman. Marc's has over 60 stores in the Cleveland, Akron, Canton, Youngstown, Columbus, and Dayton areas.

History

Bernie Shulman opened his first mega-discount drug store in Mayfield Heights, Ohio in 1969.  In 1979 one of Shulman's managers, Marc Glassman, opened his own store, Marc's, on the west side of Cleveland in the Southland Shopping Center in Middleburg Heights.  That first store was badly damaged in a fire in October 1980 that started in, and destroyed, the adjacent J.C. Penney department store. Marc's closed for several months, eventually reopening in a larger space at the same site.

Following the success of the Middleburg Heights store, Glassman built additional Marc's stores. In 1983, he purchased Shulman's store. Glassman continued to build stores in Greater Cleveland. Glassman's western stores were named Marc's, while those to the east were named Bernie Shulman's, to honor Shulman, who died in 1976, and because of brand recognition.

As the Marc's stores expanded south to Solon and Akron, the recognition of the Marc's name grew. Glassman decide to retire the Bernie Shulman's name for new stores, using the Marc's name for grand openings, including stores east of Cleveland. The first of the Marc's "superstores" opened in Garfield Heights on June 30, 1992. By year's end, all Bernie Shulman's stores were rebranded Marc's.

On August 8, 2018, a Marc's store opened in Kettering, a suburb of Dayton in southwestern Ohio, in a former Kroger site. This store is scheduled to close on February 5, 2023, due to the ending of its lease.

In March 2020, Glassman opened a 54,000 square foot store at 3112 Cleveland Ave. NW in Canton to replace the store that had been in the 30th Street Plaza since the late 1980s.

Media
The company is rarely discussed in the media. Employees are prohibited from giving interviews, and Glassman does not speak to reporters.

Other ventures

Glassman owned Xpect Discounts, in western Connecticut, originally a seven store chain which started as a drug store in the late 1980s, then expanding into a full grocery store. During the recent recessions, business slowed and the cost to operate in Connecticut continued to increase. Though still making increases in sales, Xpect started closing Connecticut stores in 2012-2013 and was reduced down to three stores, and in early 2015 MGI stated that the remaining three Connecticut stores would close and vacate by April 2016.

In the 1980s, Glassman also owned a small deli/grill restaurant next to the Middleburg Heights/Southland store, jokingly branding it as Marc's No Name Restaurant. That restaurant closed when the Southland store expanded into the space occupied by the restaurant. A small grill was set up inside the Marc's store.

In 1987, Glassman purchased, at auction, a Chuck E. Cheese, a restaurant/video game venue, in the Southland center, near the Marc's store. It was converted into Marc's Funtime Pizza Palace. Similar to a Chuck E. Cheese, it was a popular place for children's birthday parties. About a year later, he purchased a second Chuck E. Cheese, in nearby North Olmsted. When the Chuck E. Cheese franchise vacated the area, Glassman acquired and converted several venues in Greater Cleveland. By 2004, all Marc's Funtime Pizza Palaces closed. The original Marc's Funtime at Southland was among the strip of stores that were demolished to build a BJ's Wholesale Club.

In 1994, Glassman purchased Dover Lake Waterpark in Sagamore Hills, Ohio, which he operated until 2005. The park was sold in 2006 to the Brandywine Ski Resort, which used the property for expansion.

References

External links
Official site
Marc Glassman, Inc. profile

Cuyahoga County, Ohio
Pharmacies of the United States
Retail companies established in 1979
Supermarkets of the United States
1979 establishments in Ohio
Health care companies based in Ohio
Companies based in Cleveland